Lucas Emanuel Gamba (born 24 June 1987) is an Argentine footballer who plays for LDU Quito.

Career statistics

References

External links

1987 births
Living people
Argentine footballers
Argentine expatriate footballers
Argentine people of Italian descent
Association football forwards
Sportspeople from Mendoza, Argentina
Argentino de Mendoza players
Gimnasia y Tiro footballers
Deportivo Maipú players
Independiente Rivadavia footballers
Unión de Santa Fe footballers
Club Atlético Huracán footballers
Rosario Central footballers
L.D.U. Quito footballers
Argentine Primera División players
Ecuadorian Serie A players
Argentine expatriate sportspeople in Ecuador
Expatriate footballers in Ecuador